Ross-on-Wye railway station is a former junction railway station on the Hereford, Ross and Gloucester Railway constructed just to the north of the Herefordshire town of Ross-on-Wye. It was the terminus of the Ross and Monmouth Railway which joined the Hereford, Ross and Gloucester Railway just south of the station.

History
The station was opened on 1 June 1855 by the Hereford, Ross and Gloucester Railway four years after line  had received parliamentary consent to be constructed. A line from Ross-on-Wye to Tewkesbury was authorised by parliament in 1856 but was never built.

On 29 July 1862 the line was amalgamated with the Great Western Railway and in 1869 the line was converted from broad gauge to standard gauge in a five-day period. In 1873 the Ross and Monmouth Railway to Monmouth via Lydbrook was opened and it terminated at the station. The station then passed on to the Western Region of British Railways on nationalisation in 1948.

The lines to Ross closed in stages. On the Ross and Monmouth Railway passenger services were withdrawn and the section from Lydbrook Junction to Monmouth Troy was closed on 5 January 1959. The remaining section remained open until 1 November 1965 for freight traffic only. The Hereford, Ross and Gloucester Railway closed to passengers on 2 November 1964 and the line south to the junction at Grange Court closed on 1 November 1965. The line going north to Rotherwas Junction and Hereford Station closed when passenger service were withdrawn in 1964.

The brick built station building has been demolished and the site redeveloped into an industrial estate. The brick goods and engine sheds still stand.

The Severn Valley Railway station at Kidderminster Town is based on the design for Ross-on-Wye even down to the decorative cast roof crestings; the patterns for which were derived from measurement of segments of the original ones.

Stationmasters

Mr. Grundy ca. 1856
James Rycroft 1865  - 1885
William Francis Marvin 1889 - 1899 (afterwards station master at Gloucester)
Ernest C. Peglar 1900 - 1911 (formerly station master at Abergavenny)
W.P. Roberts 1911 - 1915 (afterwards station master at Stroud)
A.J. Bannister D.S.O. 1915 - 1921 (afterwards station master at Paignton)
W.J. Fey 1921 - 1925 (formerly station master at Lydney and Grange Court)
C.J. Rees 1925 - 1930 (formerly station master at Whimsy)
R.W. Kilvington 1931 
Allan A. Crabbe 1931 - 1932 (afterwards station master at Cheltenham)

References

Further reading

External links
 Station on 1952 OS Map
 Photographs of the station site today
 Local history site about the railway in Ross

Railway stations in Great Britain opened in 1855
Railway stations in Great Britain closed in 1964
Former Great Western Railway stations
Disused railway stations in Herefordshire
History of Herefordshire
Beeching closures in England
Ross-on-Wye